A number of steamships have been named Ganges, including:
, built for Nourse Line, requisitioned during the First World War
, built for Nourse Line by Harland and Wolff, sunk by the Japanese in 1942
, a West German cargo ship in service 1954–59

See also
Ganges (disambiguation) for other ships named Ganges

Ship names